The Allegheny White Fish Tapes is "a collection of Tobacco's early tapes from 1996-1999. Over 70 minutes of mostly unreleased/unheard songs. warped drum machines, purple noise, Black Flag-esque tracks, ripped cassettes, and rhymtic melodies to calm you down. Pre-vocoder & ambient and mystical synths, post-apocalyptic surrealism."

Track listing
 "Braided Cellophane" - 2:19
 "What You Gonna Say to Me?" - 1:45
 "Sunburned Face" - 2:38
 "The Bees Love Me" - 3:53
 "Left Out (The Freaky Pieces)" - 3:36
 "Enough to Calm You Down" - 4:29
 "Metal Ball Moon" - 1:36
 "Backwards Song #2" - 0:40
 "Dead Cowboy Dance (Live to ghettoblaster)" - 4:01
 "The Blue Seahorse" - 2:46
 "4-Track Phone Mistake" - 1:28
 "The Love Song" - 2:41
 "Gonna Git You Brainwashed (Long Version)" - 3:49
 "Oh Shit Doug!" - 2:47
 "I Am 6 Years Old" - 5:20
 "Eating Butterflies" - 2:46
 "I Saw Brown" - 4:39
 "All Songs Have an Ending" - 5:28
 "Too Weird to Be a Tree" - 3:30
 "Violet Induced Armpit" - 3:09
 "Friendly and Unfriendly Spiders" - 4:21
 "(untitled)" - 0:11 (unlisted)
 "The Goodbye Method" - 4:48 (unlisted)

1-6, 17, 18 & 23 from the album The Anti Freakout Method, released on CDR in 1999, less than 40 copies made
7 & 8 from EP 1996, released on cassette in 1996, less than 20 copies made
9 recorded live to ghetto blaster in 1996 with Doug and the mysterious Justin, previously unreleased
10 from EP 97, released on cassette in 1997, less than 10 copies made
11 recorded in 1997, previously unreleased
12 from the mini album The Fucked Sound, released on cassette in 1998, less than 15 copies made
13 & 14 from the album Bad Vibrations, released on cassette in 1999, less than 15 copies made
15 from the Bad Vibrations sessions, previously unreleased
16 released as an mp3 single in 1999
17-20 from the Violet Induced Armpit: Good Songs Infinity EP, released on cassette in 1999, but never given out (track 17 was previously released on Black Moth Super Rainbow's Drippers EP)
21 recorded live with drums in 1999, previously unreleased, the last recorded AWF song

See also
 Black Moth Super Rainbow
 Fucked Up Friends

References

2009 albums
Black Moth Super Rainbow albums
Tobacco (musician) albums